Vacqueyras is a French wine Appellation d'Origine Contrôlée (AOC) in the southern Rhône wine region of France, along the banks of the River Ouvèze. It is primarily a red wine region with some white and rosé wines being produced. Being a little brother of Châteauneuf-du-Pape and, arguably, Gigondas, the wine is moderately prestigious and can yield pleasing results when treated correctly.

History
Wine has been produced in the region since the 15th century. However records are sparse, reduced to mentioning large vineyards and a decree on how to keep hungry goats away from the grapes. Vacqueyras received the A.O.C. Côtes du Rhône Decree appellation in 1937, and in 1955 was promoted to Côtes du Rhône Villages status, becoming a named village in 1967. In 1990, Vacqueyras was granted its own AOC, the first in the region since Gigondas in 1971, and the first of a number of candidates for that particular honour, recently bestowed to Beaumes-de-Venise and Vinsobres.

Climate and geography
Located only a few kilometers south of Gigondas, Vacqueyras shares much of the same terroir with vineyards located in  altitude. The best vineyards are found on Plateau de Garrigues. In the lowland, warmer temperatures result in more powerful and often inelegant wines.

Grapes and wine

The bulk (97%) of the wine is red. The red wine can be much like the wines from Gigondas and at their best, the wines of Vacqueyras can match those of their northern sibling. Vacqueyras wines have been called "poor man's Châteauneuf-du-Pape."

Winemaking
Vacqueyras is, like Gigondas, known for its power rather than its elegance. The backbone of the wine is Grenache, however producers of Vacqueyras use more Syrah than is used in Gigondas which can make the style seem cooler.

See also
French wine

References

 Cotes du Rhone Web Site

Rhône wine AOCs
1990 establishments in France

de:Vacqueyras#Weinbau in Vacqueyras